Iglesia de Santa María del Conceyu (Llanes) is a church in Llanes, Asturias, Spain.

See also
Asturian art
Catholic Church in Spain

References

Churches in Llanes
Basilica churches in Spain
Bien de Interés Cultural landmarks in Asturias